Backstage is a French film directed by Emmanuelle Bercot, released in 2005. It was screened in the Official Selection (Out of Competition) category of the 62nd Venice International Film Festival.

Synopsis
Lucie, who is 17 years old, is an ordinary teenager and a fan of the popular singer, Lauren Marks, played by Emmanuelle Seigner. One day, Lucie's destiny leads her to enter into the life of her idol.

Cast
Emmanuelle Seigner as Lauren Marks
Isild Le Besco as Lucie
Noémie Lvovsky as Juliette
Valéry Zeitoun as Seymour
Samuel Benchetrit as Daniel
Edith Le Merdy as Marie-Line
Jean-Paul Walle Wa Wana as Jean-Claude
Mar Sodupe as Nanou
Éric Lartigau as the director
Lise Lamétrie as the chambermaid
Joëlle Miquel as Gisèle

References

External links

2005 films
2000s French-language films
2005 drama films
Films directed by Emmanuelle Bercot
French drama films
2000s French films